Southpointe Academy is a private K-12 school in Tsawwassen, British Columbia, Canada. It is a secular, co-education day school with approximately 630 students. Southpointe is authorized IB school offering the IB Primary Years Programme, IB Middle Years Programme, and is a candidate school for the IB Diploma Programme. The school moved to a new building in 2012 and contains learning spaces for various art and STEM subjects that offer hands-on experiences. Southpointe also offers service and outdoor education programmes.

References

External links 
 The school's official website

Schools in British Columbia
International Baccalaureate schools in British Columbia